Richard Danilo Maciel Sousa Campos (born 13 January 1990), known as just Danilo, is a Belgian professional footballer who plays as an attacking midfielder.

Club career 
Danilo signed a youth contract with Dutch club Ajax in June 2007, and was a member of their squad for the 2009–10 UEFA Europa League.

He made his professional debut for Belgian club Standard Liège during the 2010–11 season, before moving to Ukrainian team Metalurh Donetsk in February 2012.

He signed for Mordovia Saransk in July 2014, and for Dnipro Dnipropetrovsk in 2015. He signed for Turkish club Antalyaspor in January 2016. After a brief spell with Al Wahda, in February 2019 he signed for Dinamo Minsk. On 29 June 2020, he left the club as his contract expired. He then signed for AEL Limassol.

After playing with AEL Limassol, he signed for APOEL in July 2021.

International career 
Danilo represented Belgium at youth international level.

Personal life
His father is former player Wamberto. His brother Wanderson is also a footballer who plays for FC Krasnodar.

References 

1990 births
Living people
Brazilian footballers
Brazilian emigrants to Belgium
Belgian footballers
Belgium youth international footballers
Belgium under-21 international footballers
Belgian people of Brazilian descent
Association football midfielders
Belgian expatriate footballers
Belgian expatriate sportspeople in Ukraine
Expatriate footballers in the Netherlands
Expatriate footballers in Ukraine
Belgian expatriate sportspeople in Russia
Expatriate footballers in Russia
Belgian expatriate sportspeople in Turkey
Expatriate footballers in Turkey
Belgian expatriate sportspeople in the United Arab Emirates
Expatriate footballers in the United Arab Emirates
Expatriate footballers in Belarus
Belgian expatriates in Belarus
Expatriate footballers in Cyprus
Belgian expatriate sportspeople in Cyprus
Belgian Pro League players
Ukrainian Premier League players
Russian Premier League players
Süper Lig players
UAE Pro League players
AFC Ajax players
Standard Liège players
FC Metalurh Donetsk players
FC Mordovia Saransk players
FC Dnipro players
Antalyaspor footballers
Al Wahda FC players
FC Dinamo Minsk players
AEL Limassol players
APOEL FC players
People from São Luís, Maranhão
Sportspeople from Maranhão